The Kry is a Christian rock and worship band from Quebec City, Canada. The band consists of Jean-Luc La Joie (vocals, bass and acoustic guitars), Yves La Joie (drums, percussion, and backing vocals), Nic Rodriguez (bass guitar), and Steve Marcia (electric guitar).

In addition to their invitational songs, ballads, rock music, and thought-provoking lyrics, they are also known for Cassie's Song. This song was inspired by the Columbine shootings and it looks to God for healing and an explanation, while encouraging believers to be steadfast at any cost.

In 1995 their album You reached number 27 on Billboards Top Christian Albums chart.  That same year Unplugged hit 40, while in 1996 What About Now peaked at 30th position. The Kry has been featured at events such as Spirit West Coast and the Harvest Crusades. They also frequently play free concerts and lead worship on Wednesday nights at Maranatha Chapel in San Diego.

In 2000 The Kry formed The Max Ministries to evangelize specific regions, including the French-speaking areas of the world.<ref>Springboard Entertainment Press Release. "God of Infinite Worth Press Release". Springboard Entertainment, April 2005. Retrieved February 24, 2008.</ref> Although they tend to play a number of shows in Southern California, they also do extensive touring. The Kry has toured in the United States, Canada, Australia, England, France, Germany, Austria, Israel, Russia, Albania, Estonia, and Ireland.

Discography

Albums
 I'll Find You There (1992, remixed 1995)
 You (1994)
 Unplugged (1995)
 what about NOW (1996)
 Let Me Say (2000)
 La Compilation (2000) Compilation of songs sung in French
 The New York CD Project (2002)
 Undone (2002)
 God of Infinite Worth (2004)
 Peut Être (2007) "Undone" in French with extra track "Lettre D'Amour" (Letter of Love)
 You Shine (2009)
 Let Your Kingdom Come (2015)

Songs on compilations
 Pop Hits: Christian Music's No. 1 Songs, "Everywhere" (Madacy, 2003)
 Sea to Sea: I See The Cross, "Holy Is Your Name" (CMC, 2005)
 Life Is Precious: A Wes King Tribute, "Hold On" (YMZ, 2006)
 GMA Canada presents 30th Anniversary Collection, "I'll Find You There" (CMC, 2008)

Videography
 The Kry Unplugged (1995)

Music videos
 I Know Everything About You (1994)
 Faithful (2005)

Awards
Gospel Music Association Dove Awards
 2000 The Kry was nominated by the Gospel Music Association for a Dove Award for their album "Let Me Say" in the category of Recorded Music Packaging of the Year.

Gospel Music Association Canada Covenant Awards
 2007 The Kry won Francophone Album of the Year with "Peut Être", and Francophone Song of the Year with "Merveilleux".
 2007 The band also received nominations for several Gospel Music Association Canada Covenant Awards: for Francophone Album Of The Year for "Peut Être", as well two of their songs were nominated in the category of Francophone Song Of The Year: "Merveilleux" and "Seulement L’Amour De Dieu".

References

External links
 

Musical groups established in 1992
Canadian Christian rock groups
Musical groups from Quebec City